Green List (2005) was a political party in Croatia.

Green List (2017) is a political party in Croatia.

Green List may also refer to:
 Green List (Spain) (1989), a short-lived political alliance
 Green List, Ecological Initiative (1989–1994), merged into The Greens (Luxembourg)
 Federation of Green Lists (1986–1990), Italy

See also
 Shades of green (the colour)